Mia Mašić (born 4 April 1993 in Rijeka, Croatia) is a Croatian female basketball player.

References

External links
Profile at eurobasket.com

1993 births
Living people
Sportspeople from Osijek
Croatian women's basketball players
Croatian Women's Basketball League players
Shooting guards